VisiCalc ("visible calculator") is the first spreadsheet computer program for personal computers, originally released for Apple II by VisiCorp on October 17, 1979. It is considered the killer application for the Apple II, turning the microcomputer from a hobby for computer enthusiasts into a serious business tool, and then prompting IBM to introduce the IBM PC two years later. More than 700,000 copies were sold in six years, and up to 1 million copies over its history.

Initially developed for the Apple II computer using a 6502 assembler running on the Multics time sharing system, VisiCalc was ported to numerous platforms, both 8-bit and some of the early 16-bit systems. To do this, the company developed porting platforms that produced bug compatible versions. The company took the same approach when the IBM PC was launched, producing a product that was essentially identical to the original 8-bit Apple II version. Sales were initially brisk, with about 300,000 copies sold.

VisiCalc uses the A1 notation in formulas.

When Lotus 1-2-3 was launched in 1983, taking full advantage of the expanded memory and screen of the PC, VisiCalc sales ended almost overnight. Sales declined so rapidly that the company was soon insolvent. Lotus Development purchased the company in 1985, and immediately ended sales of VisiCalc and the company's other products.

History

Dan Bricklin conceived VisiCalc while watching a presentation at Harvard Business School. The professor was creating a financial model on a blackboard that was ruled with vertical and horizontal lines (resembling accounting paper) to create a table, and he wrote formulas and data into the cells. When the professor found an error or wanted to change a parameter, he had to erase and rewrite several sequential entries in the table. Bricklin realized that he could replicate the process on a computer using an "electronic spreadsheet" to view results of underlying formulae.

Bob Frankston joined Bricklin at 231 Broadway, Arlington, Massachusetts, and the pair formed the Software Arts company, and developed the VisiCalc program in two months during the winter of 1978–79.  Bricklin wrote:

Bricklin was referring to the variety of report generators that were in use at that time, including Business Planning Language (BPL) from International Timesharing Corporation (ITS) and Foresight from Foresight Systems. However, these earlier timesharing programs were not completely interactive, and they pre-dated personal computers.

Frankston described VisiCalc as a "magic sheet of paper that can perform calculations and recalculations [which] allows the user to just solve the problem using familiar tools and concepts". The Personal Software company began selling VisiCalc in mid-1979 for under , after a demonstration at the fourth West Coast Computer Faire and an official launch on June 4 at the National Computer Conference. It requires an Apple II with 32K of random-access memory (RAM), and supports saving files to magnetic tape cassette or to the Apple Disk II floppy disk system.

VisiCalc was unusually easy to use and came with excellent documentation. Apple's developer documentation cited the software as an example of one with a simple user interface. Observers immediately noticed its power. Ben Rosen speculated in July 1979, that "VisiCalc could someday become the software tail that wags (and sells) the personal computer dog". For the first 12 months, it was only available for Apple II, and became its killer app. John Markoff wrote that the computer was sold as a "VisiCalc accessory",and many bought  Apple computers to run the $100 software — more than 25% of those sold in 1979 were reportedly for VisiCalc — even if they already owned other computers. Steve Wozniak said that small businesses, not the hobbyists he and Steve Jobs had expected, purchased 90% of Apple IIs. Apple's rival Tandy Corporation used VisiCalc on Apple IIs at their headquarters. Other software supports its Data Interchange Format (DIF) to share data. One example is the Microsoft BASIC interpreter supplied with most microcomputers that run VisiCalc. This allows skilled BASIC programmers to write features, such as trigonometric functions, that VisiCalc lacks.

Bricklin and Frankston originally intended to fit the program into 16k memory, but they later realized that the program needed at least 32k. Even 32k is too small to support some features that the creators wanted to include, such as a split screen for text and graphics. However, Apple eventually began shipping all Apple IIs with 48k memory following a drop in RAM prices, enabling the developers to include more features. The initial release supported tape cassette storage, but that was quickly dropped.

At VisiCalc's release, Personal Software promised to port the program to other computers, starting with those with the MOS Technology 6502 microprocessor, and versions appeared for Atari 800 and Commodore PET. Both of those were easy, because those computers have the same CPU as Apple II, and large portions of code were reused. The PET version, which contains two separate executables for 40 and 80-column models, was widely criticized for having a very small amount of worksheet space due to the developers' inclusion of their own custom DOS, which uses a large amount of memory. The PET only has 32k versus Apple II's available 48k.

Other ports followed for Apple III, the Zilog Z80-based Tandy TRS-80 Model I, Model II, Model III, Model 4, and Sony SMC-70. The TRS-80 Model I and Sony SMC-70 ports are the only versions of VisiCalc without copy protection. The Sony SMC-70 port is the only CP/M version. Most versions are disk-based, but the PET VisiCalc came with a ROM chip that the user must install in one of the motherboard's expansion ROM sockets. The most important port is for the IBM PC, and VisiCalc became one of the first commercial packages available when the IBM PC shipped in 1981. It quickly became a best-seller on this platform, though severely limited to be compatible with the versions for the 8-bit platforms. It is estimated that 300,000 copies were sold on the PC, bringing total sales to about 1 million copies.

Several competitors appeared in the market, such as SuperCalc and Multiplan, each of which have more features and corrected deficiencies in VisiCalc, but could not overcome its market dominance. A more dramatic change occurred with the 1983 launch of Lotus Development Corporation's Lotus 1-2-3, created by former Personal Software/VisiCorp employee Mitch Kapor, who had written VisiTrend and VisiPlot. Unlike the IBM PC version of VisiCalc, 1-2-3 was written to take full advantage of the PC's increased memory, screen, and performance. Yet it was designed to be as compatible as possible with VisiCalc, including the menu structure, to allow VisiCalc users to easily migrate to 1-2-3.

1-2-3 was almost immediately successful, and in 1984, InfoWorld wrote that sales of VisiCalc were "rapidly declining", stating, that it was "the first successful software product to have gone through a complete life cycle, from conception in 1978 to introduction in 1979 to peak success in 1982 to decline in 1983 to a probable death according to industry insiders in 1984". The magazine added that the company was slow to upgrade the software, only releasing an Advanced Version of VisiCalc for Apple II in 1983, and announcing one for the IBM PC in 1984. By 1985, VisiCorp was insolvent. Lotus Development acquired Software Arts, and ended sales of the application.

Releases
 1979: Apple II
 1980: Apple III, TRS-80 Model III, Apple II, IBM PC, TRS-80 Model 2, Commodore PET CBM-80, HP 125, Atari 800
 1981: IBM PC, Sony SMC-70
 1982: Apple III
 1983: Enhanced VisiCalc for TRS-80 Model 4, Model II (with RAM expansion card) and Model 16. Used banked memory beyond the base 64 KB.

Reception 
In 1983, Softline readers named VisiCalc tenth overall and the highest non-game on the magazine's Top Thirty list of Atari 8-bit programs by popularity. II Computing listed it second on the magazine's list of top Apple II software as of late 1985, based on sales and market-share data.

In its 1980 review, BYTE wrote "The most exciting and influential piece of software that has been written for any microcomputer application is VisiCalc". It concluded, "VisiCalc is the first program available on a microcomputer that has been responsible for sales of entire systems". Creative Computings review that year similarly concluded, "for almost anyone in business, education, or any science-related field it is ... reason enough to purchase a small computer system in the first place". Compute! reported, "Every Visicalc user knows of someone who purchased an Apple just to be able to use Visicalc". Antic wrote in 1984, "VisiCalc isn't as easy to use as prepackaged home accounting programs, because you're required to design both the layout and the formulas used by the program. Because it is not pre-packaged, however, it's infinitely more powerful and flexible than such programs. You can use VisiCalc to balance your checkbook, keep track of credit card purchases, calculate your net worth, do your taxes—the possibilities are practically limitless." The Addison-Wesley Book of Atari Software 1984 gave the application an overall A+ rating, praising its documentation and calling it "indispensable ... a straight 'A' classic".

In 1999, Harvard Business School put up a plaque commemorating Dan Bricklin in the room where he had studied, saying, "Forever changed how people use computers in business."

In 2006, Charles Babcock of InformationWeek wrote that, in retrospect, "VisiCalc was flawed and clunky, and couldn't do many things users wanted it to do", but also, "It's great because it demonstrated the power of personal computing."

Since 2010, the anniversary of the October 17, 1979, launch of VisiCalc has been celebrated as Spreadsheet Day.

See also
Visi On
Triumph of the Nerds, A documentary hosted by Robert X. Cringely featuring the creators of VisiCalc and their contribution as the first killer app for the personal computer.
Timeline of computing 1950–1979

References

Further reading

External links
Dan Bricklin's Own VisiCalc Website – With history information as well as downloadable PC version
Implementing VisiCalc – By Bob Frankston, on his website
Was VisiCalc the "first" spreadsheet? – By Dan Bricklin, on his website
Three Minutes: Godfathers Of The Spreadsheet – PC World  interview with the creators of VisiCalc
Techdirt: What If VisiCalc Had Been Patented?
TRS-80 and more
 TED Talk – "Dan Bricklin: Meet the inventor of the electronic spreadsheet"
 TEDx Talk – "A Problem That Changed The World | Dan Bricklin | TEDxBeaconStreet"
 VisiCalc (1979) — Internet Archive, runnable in an emulator in the local browser.

Spreadsheet software
Microcomputer software
Apple II software
Atari 8-bit family software
1979 software